Pseudagrion kaffinum is a species of damselfly in the family Coenagrionidae. It is endemic to Ethiopia.  Its natural habitat is rivers. Commonly known as the Kaffa Sprite. Lives along slow flowing water with nearby mud and grass. Lives at altitudes of 1600-1800m above sea level.

References

Endemic fauna of Ethiopia
Coenagrionidae
Insects of Ethiopia
Insects described in 1978
Taxonomy articles created by Polbot